The 2014–15 UEFA Europa League was the 44th season of Europe's secondary club football tournament organised by UEFA, and the sixth season since it was renamed from the UEFA Cup to the UEFA Europa League.

The 2015 UEFA Europa League Final was played at the Stadion Narodowy in Warsaw, with Spanish side and title holders Sevilla defeating Ukrainian side Dnipro Dnipropetrovsk 3–2 to win a record fourth title.

This season was the first where clubs must comply with UEFA Financial Fair Play Regulations in order to participate. Moreover, this season was the first where a club from Gibraltar competed in the tournament, after the Gibraltar Football Association was accepted as the 54th UEFA member at the UEFA Congress in May 2013. They were granted one spot in the Europa League, which was taken by College Europa, the runners-up of the 2014 Rock Cup.

Starting from this edition, the UEFA Europa League winners automatically qualify for the subsequent UEFA Champions League season even if they do not qualify for the Champions League through their domestic performance. Therefore, the winners of this tournament qualify for the 2015–16 UEFA Champions League. They are guaranteed to enter at least the play-off round, and since the group stage berth reserved for the Champions League title holders will not be used (the winners of the 2014–15 UEFA Champions League are guaranteed to qualify for the group stage through domestic performance), they will be elevated to enter the group stage via this berth.

On 17 July 2014, the UEFA emergency panel ruled that Ukrainian and Russian clubs would not be drawn against each other "until further notice" due to the political unrest between the countries. Another ruling centred in regional instability was also made where Israeli teams were prohibited from hosting any UEFA competitions due to the 2014 Israel–Gaza conflict (whilst the ruling ended a short time after the war, all the country's sides were eliminated before it ended). The rules regarding suspension due to yellow card accumulation were also changed such that all bookings expired on completion of the quarter-finals and were not carried forward to the semi-finals. Moreover, this was the first season in which vanishing spray was used.

Association team allocation
A total of 195 teams from all 54 UEFA member associations participate in the 2014–15 UEFA Europa League. The association ranking based on the UEFA country coefficients is used to determine the number of participating teams for each association:
Associations 1–6 each have three teams qualify.
Associations 7–9 each have four teams qualify.
Associations 10–51 (except Liechtenstein) each have three teams qualify.
Associations 52–53 each have two teams qualify.
Liechtenstein and Gibraltar each have one team qualify (Liechtenstein organises only a domestic cup and no domestic league; Gibraltar as per decision by the UEFA Executive Committee).
The top three associations of the 2013–14 UEFA Respect Fair Play ranking each gain an additional berth.
Moreover, 33 teams eliminated from the 2014–15 UEFA Champions League are transferred to the Europa League.
The winners of the 2013–14 UEFA Europa League are given an additional entry as title holders if they do not qualify for the 2014–15 UEFA Champions League or Europa League through their domestic performance. However, this additional entry is not necessary for this season since the title holders qualified for European competitions through their domestic performance.

Association ranking
For the 2014–15 UEFA Europa League, the associations are allocated places according to their 2013 UEFA country coefficients, which takes into account their performance in European competitions from 2008–09 to 2012–13.

Apart from the allocation based on the country coefficients, associations may have additional teams participating in the Europa League, as noted below:
 – Additional berth via Fair Play ranking (Norway, Sweden, Finland)
 – Additional teams transferred from the Champions League

Distribution
Since title holders Sevilla qualified for the Europa League through their domestic performance, the spot which they qualified for in the group stage (as the fifth-placed team of the 2013–14 La Liga) is vacated, and the following changes to the default allocation system were made:
The domestic cup winners of association 7 (Ukraine) are promoted from the play-off round to the group stage.
The domestic cup winners of association 16 (Austria) are promoted from the third qualifying round to the play-off round.
The domestic cup winners of association 19 (Israel) are promoted from the second qualifying round to the third qualifying round.
The domestic cup winners of associations 33 (Finland) and 34 (Bosnia and Herzegovina) are promoted from the first qualifying round to the second qualifying round.

Redistribution rules
A Europa League place is vacated when a team qualifies for both the Champions League and the Europa League, or qualifies for the Europa League by more than one method. When a place is vacated, it is redistributed within the national association by the following rules:
When the domestic cup winners (considered as the "highest-placed" qualifier within the national association with the latest starting round) also qualify for the Champions League, their Europa League place is vacated. As a result, either of the following teams qualify for the Europa League:
The domestic cup runners-up, provided they have not yet qualified for European competitions, qualify for the Europa League as the "lowest-placed" qualifier (with the earliest starting round), with the other Europa League qualifiers moved up one "place" (the 2014–15 season is the last with this particular arrangement).
Otherwise, the highest-placed team in the league which have not yet qualified for European competitions qualify for the Europa League, with the Europa League qualifiers which finish above them in the league moved up one "place".
When the domestic cup winners also qualify for the Europa League through league position, their place through the league position is vacated. As a result, the highest-placed team in the league which have not yet qualified for European competitions qualify for the Europa League, with the Europa League qualifiers which finish above them in the league moved up one "place" if possible.
For associations where a Europa League place is reserved for the League Cup winners, they always qualify for the Europa League as the "lowest-placed" qualifier (or as the second "lowest-placed" qualifier in cases where the cup runners-up qualify as stated above). If the League Cup winners have already qualified for European competitions through other methods, this reserved Europa League place is taken by the highest-placed team in the league which have not yet qualified for European competitions.
A Fair Play place is taken by the highest-ranked team in the domestic Fair Play table which have not yet qualified for European competitions.

Teams
The labels in the parentheses show how each team qualified for the place of its starting round:
TH: Title holders
CW: Cup winners
CR: Cup runners-up
LC: League Cup winners
2nd, 3rd, 4th, 5th, 6th, etc.: League position
P-W: End-of-season European competition play-offs winners
FP: Fair Play
UCL: Transferred from the Champions League
GS: Third-placed teams from the group stage
PO: Losers from the play-off round
Q3: Losers from the third qualifying round

Notably three teams take part in the competition that do not currently play in their national top-division. They are Santos Tartu (3rd tier), St. Pölten (2nd) and Tromsø (2nd).

Notes

Round and draw dates
The schedule of the competition is as follows (all draws held at UEFA headquarters in Nyon, Switzerland, unless stated otherwise).

Matches in the qualifying, play-off, and knockout rounds may also be played on Tuesdays or Wednesdays instead of the regular Thursdays due to scheduling conflicts.

Qualifying rounds

In the qualifying rounds and the play-off round, teams were divided into seeded and unseeded teams based on their 2014 UEFA club coefficients, and then drawn into two-legged home-and-away ties. Teams from the same association could not be drawn against each other.

First qualifying round
The draw for the first and second qualifying rounds was held on 23 June 2014. The first legs were played on 1 and 3 July, and the second legs were played on 8, 10 and 11 July 2014.

|}

Notes

Second qualifying round
The first legs were played on 17 July, and the second legs were played on 22 and 24 July 2014.

|}

Notes

Third qualifying round
The draw for the third qualifying round was held on 18 July 2014. The first legs were played on 31 July, and the second legs were played on 7 August 2014.

|}

Notes

Play-off round

The draw for the play-off round was held on 8 August 2014. The first legs were played on 20 and 21 August, and the second legs were played on 28 August 2014.

|}

Notes

Group stage

The draw for the group stage was held in Monaco on 29 August 2014. The 48 teams were allocated into four pots based on their 2014 UEFA club coefficients, with the title holders being placed in Pot 1 automatically. They were drawn into twelve groups of four, with the restriction that teams from the same association could not be drawn against each other.

In each group, teams played against each other home-and-away in a round-robin format. The matchdays were 18 September, 2 October, 23 October (one home match of Metalist Kharkiv played on 22 October), 6 November, 27 November, and 11 December 2014.

A total of 26 national associations were represented in the group stage. Wolfsburg, Torino, Feyenoord, Guingamp, Saint-Étienne, Rio Ave, Dynamo Moscow, Krasnodar, Lokeren, Asteras Tripoli, Qarabağ, HJK, Astra Giurgiu, Dinamo Minsk and AaB made their debut appearances in the UEFA Europa League group stage (not counting UEFA Cup group stage appearances), although Wolfsburg had already disputed the 2009–10 UEFA Europa League knockout phase after a third place in the 2009–10 UEFA Champions League group stage.

The group winners and runners-up advanced to the round of 32, where they were joined by the eight third-placed teams of the 2014–15 UEFA Champions League group stage. See 2014–15 UEFA Europa League group stage#Tiebreakers for tiebreakers if two or more teams are equal on points.

Group A

Group B

Group C

Group D

Red Bull Salzburg's 21 goals scored set a new Europa League group stage record.

Group E

Group F

Group G

Group H

Group I

Group J

Group K

Group L

Knockout phase

In the knockout phase, teams played against each other over two legs on a home-and-away basis, except for the one-match final. The mechanism of the draws for each round was as follows:
In the draw for the round of 32, the twelve group winners and the four third-placed teams from the Champions League group stage with the better group records were seeded, and the twelve group runners-up and the other four third-placed teams from the Champions League group stage were unseeded. The seeded teams were drawn against the unseeded teams, with the seeded teams hosting the second leg. Teams from the same group or the same association could not be drawn against each other.
In the draws for the round of 16 onwards, there were no seedings, and teams from the same group or the same association could be drawn against each other.

Bracket

Round of 32
The draw for the round of 32 was held on 15 December 2014. The first legs were played on 19 February, and the second legs were played on 26 February 2015.

|}

Round of 16
The draw for the round of 16 was held on 27 February 2015. The first legs were played on 12 March, and the second legs were played on 19 March 2015.

|}

Quarter-finals
The draw for the quarter-finals was held on 20 March 2015. The first legs were played on 16 April, and the second legs were played on 23 April 2015.

|}

Notes

Semi-finals
The draw for the semi-finals and final (to determine the "home" team for administrative purposes) was held on 24 April 2015. The first legs were played on 7 May, and the second legs were played on 14 May 2015.

|}

Final

Statistics
Statistics exclude qualifying rounds and play-off round.

Top goalscorers

Top assists

Squad of the Season
The UEFA technical study group selected the following 18 players as the squad of the tournament:

See also
2014–15 UEFA Champions League
2015 UEFA Super Cup

References

External links

2014–15 UEFA Europa League
2014/15 UEFA Europa League season review

 
2
2014-15